Daniel Peña Sánchez de Rivera (Madrid, 1948) is a Spanish engineer and statistician.

Education
Peña obtained a Ph.D. in industrial engineering from the Technical University of Madrid and studied sociology and statistics at Complutense University of Madrid and business administration Harvard University. He is an active researcher in statistics and econometrics and was rector of Charles III University of Madrid in 2007–2015.

Career 
He has been professor at Technical University of Madrid, and visiting professor at  University of Wisconsin–Madison and University of Chicago. He is now Emeritus professor at Charles III University of Madrid. He has been director of the Journal Revista Estadística Española and President of Sociedad española de Estadística e Investigación Operativa, Vicepresident of the Interamerican Statistical Institute and President of European Courses in Advanced Statistics.

He has published fourteen books and more than 250 research articles in time series analysis, 
multivariate methods, Bayesian Statistics and Econometrics that have received more than 10,000 references. He is fellow of the American Statistical Association, The Institute of Mathematical Statistics and member of the International Statistical Institute  and member of the Royal Academie of Sciences in Spain. He has received the Youden Prize in 2006, from ASA and ASQ, the Premio Rey Jaime I for his research in 2011 and the first  "Premio Nacional de Estadística" of Spain in 2020.

References

20th-century Spanish engineers
Statisticians
Spanish industrial engineers
Rectors of universities in Spain
1948 births
Living people
Academic staff of the Charles III University of Madrid
Harvard Business School alumni
Spanish expatriates in the United States
Engineers from Madrid
21st-century Spanish engineers